Lemonia strigata is a moth in the family Brahmaeidae (older classifications placed it in Lemoniidae). It was described by Hans Rebel in 1910. It is also listed as a synonym of Lemonia taraxaci.

References

Brahmaeidae
Moths described in 1910